Corsley Edwards (born March 5, 1979) is an American former professional basketball player. He played college basketball for Central Connecticut.

Early life and college
Edwards was born in Baltimore, Maryland, and graduated from Lake Clifton High School in 1998. He played collegiately at Central Connecticut State University and led the team to its first ever NCAA Tournament appearance in 2000, losing a close 88–78 battle as a #15 seed against #2 seeded Iowa State.

Professional career
Edwards was selected by the Sacramento Kings with the final (58th) pick in the 2002 NBA draft but he did not sign with them. In its 2002 draft, the Yakima Sun Kings of the Continental Basketball Association (CBA) selected Edwards as the top (17th overall) pick in the CBA third round. The Sun Kings signed Edwards on November 1, 2002 but waived him on December 2, 2002. He then signed with the Sioux Falls Skyforce of the CBA. In the 2003 CBA All-Star Game, Edwards led the National Conference All-Stars in rebounding with 12 rebounds. He was selected to the CBA All-Rookie Team in 2003.

In the 2003/04 season he played center for RB Montecatini Terme in the Italian LegaDue.

He appeared in 10 games for the New Orleans Hornets during the 2004-05 NBA season averaging 2.7 points per game. The last game of that 10-game run ended up being Edwards' final game in the NBA, being played on January 12, 2005, in a 76–90 loss to the Detroit Pistons where he recorded 2 points, 1 rebound and 1 steal.

He returned to the Sioux Falls Skyforce in 2005 and won the 2005 CBA championship with the team while being named the Finals Most Valuable Player. On April 5, 2005, he joined Fenerbahçe of the Turkish Basketball League. With Fenerbahçe, he averaged 12.5 points and 7.1 rebounds.

In 2006, Edwards was the first player taken in NBA D-League Draft by the Anaheim Arsenal. In 2005–06 he played in Granada, Spain. Edwards returned to Turkey in February 2007 with the team Banvit B.K. In 2008–2009, he played with the Yunnan Honghe Running Bulls in China. In 2009–2010, he played with Shaanxi Kylins.
For the 2010–2011 season he signed with the Zagreb club KK Cedevita, where he averaged 12.9 points per game and helped the team enter the Eurocup Basketball 2010–11 Final four. In August 2011 he signed with Anwil Włocławek in Poland. For the 2012–13 season, he signed with KK Igokea. In November 2013, he signed with Homenetmen Beirut.

Coaching career
In October 2014, Edwards was appointed an assistant coach for the Denver Nuggets.

On September 26, 2016, Edwards was appointed an assistant coach of the Greensboro Swarm, a new NBA Development League franchise. He served as an assistant there for three seasons.

References

External links
 Career stats at basketball-reference.com
 Corsley Edwards at Eurobasket.com
 FIBA.com profile
 TBLStat.net profile

1979 births
Living people
ABA League players
American expatriate basketball people in Bosnia and Herzegovina
American expatriate basketball people in China
American expatriate basketball people in Croatia
American expatriate basketball people in Egypt
American expatriate basketball people in Italy
American expatriate basketball people in Lebanon
American expatriate basketball people in Poland
American expatriate basketball people in Spain
American expatriate basketball people in Turkey
American expatriate basketball people in the United Arab Emirates
American men's basketball players
Anaheim Arsenal players
Bandırma B.İ.K. players
Basketball coaches from Maryland
Basketball players from Baltimore
Big3 players
Caciques de Humacao players
CB Granada players
Centers (basketball)
Central Connecticut Blue Devils men's basketball players
Dakota Wizards players
Denver Nuggets assistant coaches
Fenerbahçe men's basketball players
Greensboro Swarm coaches
İstanbul Teknik Üniversitesi B.K. players
KK Cedevita players
KK Igokea players
KK Włocławek players
Liga ACB players
Montecatiniterme Basketball players
New Orleans Hornets players
Power forwards (basketball)
Sacramento Kings draft picks
Sioux Falls Skyforce (CBA) players
United States Basketball League players
Yakima Sun Kings players
American men's 3x3 basketball players